Andrew Douglas Nicol (born 12 March 1971), is a former Scotland international rugby union player. A scrum-half, Nicol won 23 caps for Scotland and had brief spells as a replacement on two British & Irish Lions tours.

Rugby Union career

Amateur career

Nicol was born on 12 March 1971 in Dundee and educated at the High School of Dundee and Dundee Institute of Technology (now Abertay University). He played for Dundee HSFP.

Provincial and professional career

In the amateur era Nicol played for North and Midlands.

When the game turned professional Nicol played for Bath. As captain of Bath, he was the first British player to lift the Heineken Cup, when they defeated Brive in 1998.

In 1999 Nicol moved from Bath to Glasgow Warriors. He made his competitive debut for the Glasgow provincial side on 3 September 1999, playing an away match against Pontypridd in the Welsh-Scottish League. He became Glasgow Warrior No. 65.

Nicol retired at the end of the 2002–03 season,

International career

Nicol played for Scotland 'B' against France 'B' on 02 March 1991; he played for the 'B' side again against Ireland 'B' on 28 December 1991.

Nicol made his debut for Scotland in 1992 against England. Over 10 years he won 23 caps for Scotland, a period when he faced strong competition for selection from scrum halves Gary Armstrong and Bryan Redpath. He never played in a World Cup, not being selected in 1991 and 1999, and being injured in 1995.

Nicol captained Scotland in 2000 when Scotland beat England 19–13 at a rain-soaked Murrayfield and so prevented England from achieving the Grand Slam. 

Nicol was a replacement on the 1993 British Lions tour to New Zealand, when he appeared in one game, playing six minutes. He was also called up as a late replacement for the Lions on their 2001 tour, replacing Austin Healey, whilst on holiday in Australia. In total he spent seven days with the Lions across two tours.

Coaching career

Nicol managed a Scottish-based sevens team, Bone Steelers, at the Dubai 7s from 2004 until 2006 and again in 2009.

Other interests

On 16 February 2007, Nicol was defeated in the Rectorial election at the University of Dundee. Former British Ambassador Craig Murray was duly elected Lord Rector with 632 votes to Nicol's 582. He was awarded an honorary degree by Abertay University in 2013. 

Nicol is a commentator for BBC Sport.

References

External links 
 Sporting Heroes Profile
 Profile & Statistics on ESPN Scrum
 Lions profile

1971 births
Living people
People educated at the High School of Dundee
Alumni of Abertay University
Scottish rugby union players
British & Irish Lions rugby union players from Scotland
Rugby union scrum-halves
Glasgow Warriors players
Bath Rugby players
Scottish rugby union coaches
Scotland international rugby union players
Dundee HSFP players
Scotland international rugby sevens players
Male rugby sevens players
Rugby union players from Dundee